Conocara is a genus of slickheads found in the deep waters of the oceans.

The generic name derives from Latin conicus ("cone-shaped") and Greek κάρα (kara, "face, head").

Species
There are currently ten recognized species in this genus:
 Conocara bertelseni Sazonov, 2002
 Conocara fiolenti Sazonov & Ivanov, 1979 (Fiolenti's smooth-head)
 Conocara kreffti Sazonov, 1997 (Wrinkled slickhead)
 Conocara macropterum (Vaillant, 1888) (Longfin smooth-head)

 Conocara microlepis (Lloyd, 1909) (Elongate smooth-head)
 Conocara murrayi (Koefoed, 1927) (Murray's smooth-head)
 Conocara nigrum (Günther, 1878) (Flathead slickhead)
 Conocara paxtoni Sazonov, A. Williams & Kobyliansky, 2009
 Conocara salmoneum (T. N. Gill & C. H. Townsend, 1897) (Salmon smooth-head)
 Conocara werneri Nybelin, 1947 (Werner's smooth-head)

References

Alepocephalidae